Agitococcus is a genus in the phylum Bacillota (Bacteria).

Etymology
The name Agitococcus derives from the Latin agito, to shake; and New Latin coccus (from Greek  (κόκκος), berry).

Species
The genus contains a single species, namely Agitococcus lubricus ( Franzmann and Skerman 1981), type species of the genus. The specific name is from the Latin lubricus, slippery.

References

Bacteria genera
Lactobacillales
Monotypic bacteria genera